Leana Sheryle Wen (born Wen Linyan; January 27, 1983) is an American physician, author, professor, and former president of Planned Parenthood. She is a practicing physician, former Health Commissioner for the City of Baltimore, Washington Post op-ed columnist, CNN medical analyst and author of the books When Doctors Don't Listen: How to Avoid Misdiagnoses and Unnecessary Tests and Lifelines: A Doctor's Journey in the Fight for Public Health. Currently, she is a research professor of Health Policy and Management at the George Washington University, where she is a Distinguished Fellow in the Fitzhugh Mullan Institute for Health Workforce Equity. She is also a Nonresident Senior Fellow at the Brookings Institution.

Wen previously practiced as an emergency physician at the George Washington University, where she also served as a professor in the School of Medicine & Health Sciences and professor in health policy at the Milken Institute School of Public Health. Prior to this, she was an emergency physician at Brigham and Women's Hospital and Massachusetts General Hospital, where she was on the faculty of Harvard Medical School. She also served as the national president of the American Medical Student Association and the American Academy of Emergency Medicine/Resident and Student Association.

From December 2014 until October 2018, Wen served as the health commissioner for Baltimore City under two mayors. She resigned when she was appointed head of the Planned Parenthood Federation of America. She was the first physician to serve as the organization's president in nearly 50 years. Wen was asked to step down by Planned Parenthood's board of directors on July 16, 2019.

In May 2020, Wen became a contributing columnist for The Washington Post, focusing on health policy and public health. She writes a weekly column and a weekly newsletter called The Checkup with Dr. Wen. She has served as a public health communicator during the COVID-19 pandemic and 2022 monkeypox outbreak, appearing frequently on CNN as an on-air medical analyst. Wen was asked to testify four times to Congress during the COVID-19 pandemic, including twice to the Select Subcommittee on the Coronavirus Crisis. Wen's evolving views on the COVID-19 pandemic have garnered support and controversy from both sides of the political spectrum. A Texas man pleaded guilty to threatening her due to her advocacy for COVID-19 vaccines and was sentenced in federal court to six months in prison.

Early life and education 
Born Wen Linyan in Shanghai China on January 27, 1983, to Ying Sandy Zhang and Xiaolu Wen, Wen moved with her parents to the U.S. when she was eight, by then having the English name Leana Sheryle Wen. Granted political asylum, the Wen family lived in Compton and East Los Angeles in Southern California. In 2003, Wen and her family became U.S. citizens.

Wen's mother, who died of breast cancer in 2010, first worked as a hotel room cleaner and video store clerk before becoming an elementary school teacher. Her father delivered newspapers and was a dishwasher, later serving as technology manager for The Chinese Daily News in Los Angeles.

Attending the Early Entrance Program (EEP) at California State University, Los Angeles starting at age 13, Wen graduated summa cum laude at age 18 with a bachelor's degree in biochemistry, in 2001. She received a Doctor of Medicine from Washington University School of Medicine and has two master's degrees, one in Economic and Social History and another in Modern Chinese Studies, both from the Merton College, Oxford in England where she was a Rhodes Scholar. She also met her future husband, Sebastian Walker, during her time in England.

In 2005, Wen took a one-year leave of absence from medical school to serve as the national president of the American Medical Student Association, where she led campaigns to increase healthcare access, decrease health disparities, and combat conflicts of interest between physicians and the pharmaceutical companies who notoriously use attractive sales representatives and free gifts to influence doctors, especially young interns and medical residents. Wen became involved in U.S. and international health policy during medical school, serving in Geneva, Switzerland as a fellow for the World Health Organization and in Rwanda as a fellow for the U.S. Department of Defense. In addition, she advised the U.S. Congress on physician workforce and medical education through her appointment on the Council on Graduate Medical Education by the U.S. Secretary of Health and Human Services.

Career 
Following medical school, Wen completed a residency at Brigham and Women's Hospital (BWH) and Massachusetts General Hospital (Mass General) and a clinical fellowship at Harvard Medical School in Boston. She is board certified in emergency medicine. Wen started working in emergency medicine at BWH and Mass General before moving to the ER at the George Washington University (GW) in Washington, DC, where she became a professor in emergency and health policy, and the Director of Patient-Centered Care Research. She served as a consultant to the Brookings Institution and the China Medical Board, and conducted international health systems research including in South Africa, Slovenia, Nigeria, Singapore, and China.

As president of Planned Parenthood, Wen worked to expand non-abortion services like maternal health and mental health services and to rebrand Planned Parenthood from its image as an abortion rights advocate to a comprehensive women's health organization that serves women and families. She spoke out about her own experiences as a cervical cancer survivor who struggled with infertility, and about a miscarriage she suffered while in the role. Wen was named one of TIME's 100 Most Influential People in 2019 and referred to by Cynthia Nixon in the magazine as a "fierce visionary" for reproductive rights and health care.

In July 2019, Leana Wen was forced out of her job as president of Planned Parenthood. The board gave no reason, but sources cited a dispute over management and organizational philosophy. In a letter to Planned Parenthood affiliates, Wen claimed philosophical differences in the direction of the organization. On July 19, 2019, Wen published an opinion editorial in The New York Times which set forth the circumstances underlying her departure from Planned Parenthood. She stated her view that "As one of the few national health care organizations with a presence in all 50 states, Planned Parenthood's mandate should be to promote reproductive health care as part of a wide range of policies that affect women's health and public health."

Patient advocacy 
In 2013, St. Martin's Press published her book, When Doctors Don't Listen: How to Avoid Misdiagnoses and Unnecessary Tests with coauthor Joshua Kosowsky. It is about how patients can take control of their health to advocate for better care for themselves.

Wen wrote a blog, The Doctor is Listening. She was a regular contributor to the Huffington Post and Psychology Today on patient empowerment and healthcare reform. She was also an advisor to the then-newly established Patient-Centered Outcomes Research Institute, and an advisor to the Lown Institute and the Medical Education Futures Study. She was the founder of Who's My Doctor, an international campaign that called for transparency in medicine.

Wen is a frequent keynote speaker on healthcare reform, education, and leadership, and has given several TED Talks. Her TED talk on transparency in medicine has been viewed over 1.9 million times.

Baltimore City health commissioner 
In December 2014, Wen was appointed by Mayor Stephanie Rawlings-Blake to serve as the health commissioner; in December 2016, she was reappointed by Mayor Catherine Pugh. In this role, she oversaw the Baltimore City Health Department, an agency of 1,100 employees and $130 million annual budget with wide-ranging responsibilities, including management of acute communicable diseases, animal control, chronic disease prevention, emergency preparedness, food service inspections, HIV/AIDS and other sexually transmitted diseases, maternal-child health, school health, senior services, and youth violence issues.

She directed the city's public health recovery efforts after the 2015 Baltimore riots, including ensuring prescription medication access to seniors after the closure of 13 pharmacies, and developing the Mental Health/Trauma Recovery Plan, with 24-hour crisis counseling, and healing circles and group counseling in schools, community groups, and churches.

Following the 2015 Baltimore riots, the Baltimore City Health Department team launched numerous campaigns, including a citywide trauma response plan, youth health and wellness strategy, violence prevention programs, B'Healthy in B'More blog, and B'More Health Talks, a biweekly town hall and podcast series on health disparities.

In May 2016, she served as the commencement speaker for the University of Maryland School of Medicine and the Notre Dame of Maryland University, where she was awarded an honorary Doctorate of Humane Letters. She has also served as commencement speaker at Washington University School of Medicine and at the Johns Hopkins Bloomberg School of Public Health. In 2017, Wen was named as one of Modern Healthcare's 50 Most Influential Physician Executives and Leaders and in 2018 as one of its Top 25 Minority Physician Executives.

In March 2018, on behalf of Wen and the Baltimore City Health Department, the City of Baltimore sued the Trump administration for cutting teen pregnancy prevention funds, which resulted in a federal judge ordering the Trump administration to restore $5 million in grant funding to two Baltimore-based teen pregnancy prevention programs. She wrote an opinion editorial criticizing proposed changes to the Title X program which would affect health clinics in Baltimore providing reproductive health care for low income women.  This court decision was later reversed by the 9th Circuit court, enabling the Trump administration to withhold Title X funding for abortion.

Opioid overdose epidemic response 
Wen has led implementation of the Baltimore opioid overdose prevention and response plan, which includes a blanket prescription for the opioid antidote, naloxone; "hotspotting" and street outreach teams to target individuals most at risk; training family/friends on naloxone use; and launching a new public education campaign. Wen testified to the U.S. Senate HELP Committee and U.S. House Oversight Committee on Baltimore's overdose prevention efforts. She led a group of state and city health officials to petition the Food and Drug Administration (FDA) on adding black box warnings to opioids and benzodiazepines. In March 2016, she was invited by the White House to join President Barack Obama and CNN's Dr. Sanjay Gupta on a panel discussion, where she spoke about Baltimore's response. She convened doctors and public health leaders to sign the Baltimore Statement on the Importance of Childhood Vaccinations and to successfully advocate to ban the sale of powdered alcohol in Maryland and synthetic drugs in Baltimore.

Congressman Elijah Cummings cited Wen's efforts to combat the opioid epidemic in Baltimore and sought her help in creating national legislation to change how the United States fights it.

In 2018, the National Association of County and City Health Officials awarded the Baltimore City Health Department the Local Health Department of the Year.

Planned Parenthood 
Wen was appointed to the position of President of Planned Parenthood Federation of America on September 18, 2018. She was the first medical doctor to serve in the role in nearly 50 years and was the first woman doctor to do so ever. In an interview with Elle, Wen described her excitement to be at the helm of the organization where both she and her mother had received significant medical care many years prior. Wen envisioned a new direction for discourse surrounding Planned Parenthood, endeavoring to frame abortion access as an issue of healthcare rather than politics. She also wanted to expand the services provided by Planned Parenthood clinics to include treatment for medical concerns unrelated to reproduction, especially treatment for opioid addiction and easy access to Naloxone (in keeping with her former work as Health Commissioner in Baltimore). In an op-ed for the New York Times after her departure from the organization, she described her initial goal as "finding common ground with the large majority of Americans who can unite behind the goal of improving the health and well-being of women and children." Wen's appointment and proposed strategic plan received mixed reviews, with commentators on both sides of the political spectrum both praising her novel approach and criticizing it as "backing away from the fight [for abortion access]."

Wen's tenure at PPFA saw many major events with implications for reproductive healthcare, starting with the confirmation hearings and appointment to the Supreme Court of Brett Kavanaugh, and ending with the implementation of the nationwide Title X gag rule under the Trump-Pence administration. This legislation prevented medical providers who received funding from Title X from referring patients for abortion services and also prohibited the performance of abortions in the same facility as providers who received Title X funding (the rule was later overturned in 2021 by the Biden-Harris administration). The period also saw a marked increase in the number of laws passed at the state level that restricted access to abortions.

Wen resigned from her position in July 2019, after only 8 months. In public statements, she cited "philosophical differences" between her own views and those of board members. In a subsequent op-ed, Wen attributed her sudden departure more specifically to disagreements over the centrality of abortion in the mission of Planned Parenthood. Echoing her earlier statements, she described her goal to focus on the more holistic elements of the organization, while the board instead wanted to focus on the political debate surrounding abortion rights. Other sources alluded to Wen's incompatibilities with the organization on an interpersonal level, citing organization members' difficulty adapting to her leadership style.

The Washington Post 
Wen started writing for The Washington Post as a contributing op-ed writer in 2019. Her role as a columnist became formalized in 2020, and she began anchoring a weekly newsletter on public health and healthcare called The Checkup with Dr. Wen. Her commentaries for the Post started with a heavy focus on COVID-19 and have touched on a range of other issues, including the nursing shortage, the opioid epidemic, reemergence of polio, cancer, mental health, obesity, marijuana, and other public health and policy topics. In 2023, Wen reccived attention for a piece claiming that Covid deaths were being over counted, with some claiming vindication after claims of over counting deaths were decried as conspiracy theories years earlier.

Awards
In 2021, she was named one of Modern Healthcare's 100 Most Influential People in Healthcare. She was also inducted as a member of the Council on Foreign Relations and received the YWCA Excellence in Public Health Award. In 2022, she was awarded the Walter C. Alvarez award for excellence in communicating healthcare developments and concepts to the public by the American Medical Writers Association.

Personal life 
Wen married South Africa native Sebastian Neil Walker in Boston in February 2012, after a blessing ceremony in Cape Town in November 2011. They have two children: a son born in 2017 and a daughter born in 2020.

Selected publications

References

External links 
Washington Post bio
World Economic Forum bio

1983 births
Alumni of Merton College, Oxford
American medical writers
American public health doctors
Women public health doctors
American Rhodes Scholars
California State University, Los Angeles alumni
Chinese emigrants to the United States
Living people
People with acquired American citizenship
Physicians from California
Physicians from Maryland
Physicians from Shanghai
Presidents of Planned Parenthood
Washington University School of Medicine alumni
Writers from Baltimore
Writers from Los Angeles
Writers from Shanghai
Washington University in St. Louis alumni
21st-century physicians
American health officials